Villainaire is the third full length album from The Dead Science, released in 2008 on Constellation Records.

Track listing
 "Throne Of Blood (The Jump Off)" – 3:40
 "The Dancing Destroyer" – 2:50
 "Make Mine Marvel" – 3:36
 "Monster Island Czars" – 3:41
 "Lamentable" – 2:40
 "Death Duel Productions" – 3:15
 "Wife You" – 4:38
 "Holliston" – 3:46
 "Black Lane" – 3:31
 "Sword Cane" – 4:57
 "Clemency" – 3:31

Guest musicians
(in order of appearance)
 Monica Schleyv – Harp
 Morgan Henderson – Synth
 Katrina Ford – Voice
 Paris Hurley – Violin
 Alex Guy – Viola
 Lori Goldston – Cello
 The Horns of Orkestar Zirkonium:
 Stephen Lohrentz – Trumpet
 Sam Boshnack – Trumpet
 Ivan Molton – Alto Saxophone
 Jeff Walker – Trombone
 Kate Ryan – Voice
 Craig Wedren – Voice

References

External links
 An article on the album
 Constellation Records (record label)
 Band Website

2008 albums
The Dead Science albums
Constellation Records (Canada) albums